Tommy Conroy may refer to:

 Tommy Conroy (Dublin Gaelic footballer)
 Tommy Conroy (Mayo Gaelic footballer)

See also
 Tom Conroy, American politician
 Tom Conroy (rugby league)